Calcium (20Ca) has 26 known isotopes, ranging from 35Ca to 60Ca. There are five stable isotopes (40Ca, 42Ca, 43Ca, 44Ca and 46Ca), plus one isotope (48Ca) with such a long half-life that for all practical purposes it can be considered stable. The most abundant isotope, 40Ca, as well as the rare 46Ca, are theoretically unstable on energetic grounds, but their decay has not been observed. Calcium also has a cosmogenic isotope, radioactive 41Ca, which has a half-life of 99,400 years. Unlike cosmogenic isotopes that are produced in the atmosphere, 41Ca is produced by neutron activation of 40Ca. Most of its production is in the upper metre of the soil column, where the cosmogenic neutron flux is still sufficiently strong. 41Ca has received much attention in stellar studies because it decays to 41K, a critical indicator of solar system anomalies. The most stable artificial radioisotopes are 45Ca with a half-life of 163 days and 47Ca with a half-life of 4.5 days. All other calcium isotopes have half-lives measured in minutes or less.

40Ca comprises about 97% of naturally occurring calcium. 40Ca is also one of the daughter products of 40K decay, along with 40Ar. While K–Ar dating has been used extensively in the geological sciences, the prevalence of 40Ca in nature has impeded its use in dating. Techniques using mass spectrometry and a double spike isotope dilution have been used for K–Ca age dating.

List of isotopes 

|-
| rowspan=2|35Ca
| rowspan=2 style="text-align:right" | 20
| rowspan=2 style="text-align:right" | 15
| rowspan=2|35.00514(21)#
| rowspan=2|25.7(2) ms
| β+, p (95.9%)
| 34Ar
| rowspan=2|1/2+#
| rowspan=2|
| rowspan=2|
|-
| β+, 2p (4.1%)
| 33Cl
|-
| rowspan=2|36Ca
| rowspan=2 style="text-align:right" | 20
| rowspan=2 style="text-align:right" | 16
| rowspan=2|35.99307(4)
| rowspan=2|101.2(15) ms
| β+, p (51.2%)
| 35Ar
| rowspan=2|0+
| rowspan=2|
| rowspan=2|
|-
| β+ (48.8%)
| 36K
|-
| rowspan=2|37Ca
| rowspan=2 style="text-align:right" | 20
| rowspan=2 style="text-align:right" | 17
| rowspan=2|36.9858979(7)
| rowspan=2|181.1(10) ms
| β+, p (82.1%)
| 36Ar
| rowspan=2|3/2+#
| rowspan=2|
| rowspan=2|
|-
| β+ (17.9%)
| 37K
|-
| 38Ca
| style="text-align:right" | 20
| style="text-align:right" | 18
| 37.97631923(21)
| 443.70(25) ms
| β+
| 38K
| 0+
|
|
|-
| 39Ca
| style="text-align:right" | 20
| style="text-align:right" | 19
| 38.9707108(6)
| 860.3(8) ms
| β+
| 39K
| 3/2+
|
|
|-
| 40Ca
| style="text-align:right" | 20
| style="text-align:right" | 20
| 39.962590866(22)
| colspan=3 align=center|Observationally Stable
| 0+
| 0.96941(156)
| 0.96933–0.96947
|-
| 41Ca
| style="text-align:right" | 20
| style="text-align:right" | 21
| 40.96227792(15)
| 9.94(15)×104 y
| EC
| 41K
| 7/2−
| Trace
|
|-
| 42Ca
| style="text-align:right" | 20
| style="text-align:right" | 22
| 41.95861783(16)
| colspan=3 align=center|Stable
| 0+
| 0.00647(23)
| 0.00646–0.00648
|-
| 43Ca
| style="text-align:right" | 20
| style="text-align:right" | 23
| 42.95876643(24)
| colspan=3 align=center|Stable
| 7/2−
| 0.00135(10)
| 0.00135–0.00135
|-
| 44Ca
| style="text-align:right" | 20
| style="text-align:right" | 24
| 43.9554815(3)
| colspan=3 align=center|Stable
| 0+
| 0.02086(110)
| 0.02082–0.02092
|-
| 45Ca
| style="text-align:right" | 20
| style="text-align:right" | 25
| 44.9561863(4)
| 162.61(9) d
| β−
| 45Sc
| 7/2−
|
|
|-
| 46Ca
| style="text-align:right" | 20
| style="text-align:right" | 26
| 45.9536880(24)
| colspan=3 align=center|Observationally Stable
| 0+
| 4(3)×10−5
| 4×10−5–4×10−5
|-
| 47Ca
| style="text-align:right" | 20
| style="text-align:right" | 27
| 46.9545414(24)
| 4.536(3) d
| β−
| 47Sc
| 7/2−
|
|
|-
| 48Ca
| style="text-align:right" | 20
| style="text-align:right" | 28
| 47.95252290(10)
| (6.4)×1019 y|| β−β−
| 48Ti
| 0+
| 0.00187(21)
| 0.00186–0.00188
|-
| 49Ca
| style="text-align:right" | 20
| style="text-align:right" | 29
| 48.95562288(22)
| 8.718(6) min
| β−
| 49Sc
| 3/2−
|
|
|-
| 50Ca
| style="text-align:right" | 20
| style="text-align:right" | 30
| 49.9574992(17)
| 13.9(6) s
| β−
| 50Sc
| 0+
| 
| 
|-
| 51Ca
| style="text-align:right" | 20
| style="text-align:right" | 31
| 50.9609957(6)
| 10.0(8) s
| β−
| 51Sc
| (3/2−)
|
|
|-
| rowspan=2|52Ca
| rowspan=2 style="text-align:right" | 20
| rowspan=2 style="text-align:right" | 32
| rowspan=2|51.9632136(7)
| rowspan=2|4.6(3) s
| β− (98%)
| 52Sc
| rowspan=2|0+
| rowspan=2|
| rowspan=2|
|-
| β−, n (2%)
| 51Sc
|-
| rowspan=2|53Ca
| rowspan=2 style="text-align:right" | 20
| rowspan=2 style="text-align:right" | 33
| rowspan=2|52.96845(5)
| rowspan=2|461(90) ms
| β− (60%)
| 53Sc
| rowspan=2|3/2−#
| rowspan=2|
| rowspan=2|
|-
| β−, n (40%)
| 52Sc
|-
| rowspan=2|54Ca
| rowspan=2 style="text-align:right" | 20
| rowspan=2 style="text-align:right" | 34
| rowspan=2|53.97299(5)
| rowspan=2|90(6) ms
| β− (93%)
| 54Sc
| rowspan=2|0+
| rowspan=2|
| rowspan=2|
|-
| β−, n (7%)
| 53Sc
|-
| 55Ca
| style="text-align:right" | 20
| style="text-align:right" | 35
| 54.98030(32)#
| 22(2) ms
| β−
| 55Sc
| 5/2−#
|
|
|-
| 56Ca
| style="text-align:right" | 20
| style="text-align:right" | 36
| 55.98508(43)#
| 11(2) ms
| β−
| 56Sc
| 0+
|
|
|-
| rowspan=2|57Ca
| rowspan=2 style="text-align:right" | 20
| rowspan=2 style="text-align:right" | 37
| rowspan=2|56.99262(43)#
| rowspan=2|5# ms
| β−
| 57Sc
| rowspan=2|5/2−#
| rowspan=2|
| rowspan=2|
|-
| β−, n
| 56Sc
|-
| rowspan=2|58Ca
| rowspan=2 style="text-align:right" | 20
| rowspan=2 style="text-align:right" | 38
| rowspan=2|57.99794(54)#
| rowspan=2|3# ms
| β−
| 58Sc
| rowspan=2|0+
| rowspan=2|
| rowspan=2|
|-
| β−, n
| 57Sc
|-
| 59Ca
| style="text-align:right" | 20
| style="text-align:right" | 39
| 
| 
| β−
| 59Sc
| 
|
|
|-
| 60Ca
| style="text-align:right" | 20
| style="text-align:right" | 40
| 
| 
| β−
| 60Sc
| 0+
|
|

References

Further reading
 C. Michael Hogan. 2010. Calcium. ed. A. Jorgenson and C. Cleveland. Encyclopedia of Earth, National Council for Science and the Environment, Washington, D.C.

External links 
National Isotope Development Center Official website
Calcium isotopes data from The Berkeley Laboratory Isotopes Project's

 
Calcium
Calcium